A plunger lift is an artificial lift method of deliquifying a natural gas well. A plunger is used to remove contaminants from productive natural gas wells, such as water (in liquid, mist, or ice forms), sand, oil and wax.

The basics of the plunger is to open and close the well shutoff valve at the optimum times, to bring up the plunger and the contaminants and maximize natural gas production. A well without a deliquification technique will stop flowing or slow down and become a non-productive well, long before a properly deliquified well.

The plunger lift has low energy cost, low environmental impact, low capital investment and low maintenance cost. Modern wellhead controllers offer a variety of criteria to control the plunger. The original controllers were just timers, with fixed open and close cycles.

Measuring the various pressures in the system allows intelligent and reactive control. The pressures often measured are casing, tubing, line, and differential (DP). The other items measured are plunger arrival times, flow rates, temperatures and status of various auxiliary equipment: oil tank level, compressor status.

Open Well Criteria
 Plunger Drop Timer - Minimum close time to allow the Plunger to reach the bottom.
 Tube - Line Pressure
 Casing - Line Pressure
 Casing - Tubing Pressure
 Load Ratio (Casing-Tubing) / (Casing - Line)
 Foss and Gaul Equation
 Tubing Pressure
 Casing Pressure
 Static Pressure
 External Variables

Close Well Criteria
 Flow Time
 After Flow Timer
 Turner/Coleman Flow Rate
 Load Ratio
 DP (Differential)
 Flow Rate
 Tubing - Line Pressure
 Casing - Tubing Pressure
 Casing Pressure
 Static Pressure
 Tubing Pressure
 Line Pressure

Notes

References
 Lea, James F., "Dynamic Analysis of Plunger Lift Operations", (Journal of Petroleum Technology,) Vol. 34, No. 11, pp 2617–2629, Nov. 1982.
 State of Oklahoma Margin Wells Handbook (pdf)
 Installing Plunger Lift Systems, EPA 2006
 
 
 
 
 Сердюков О.М.  СЧАСТЛИВОГО ПОЛЕТА! ж.ИЗОБРЕТАТЕЛЬ И РАЦИОНАЛИЗАТОР, 2002 г. 11(635) с.26,  
"NOV Mono Plunger Lift Systems Page"

Patents
 Pat #1769637 10/20/1925 
 Pat #1784096 07/23/1929 
 Pat #1896232 11/21/1931 
 Pat #2001012 03/21/1934 
 Patent SU 171351.Priority 14/11/1963. Bulletin No,16 05/05/1969   
 Pat #4150721 01/11/1978 
 Pat #5957200 11/18/1997 
 Pat #6209637  05/14/1999
 Pat #6467541  08/01/2000
 Pat #7270187 04/29/2003 
 Patent RU 2214504. Flying valve, its detachable element and the method of wells operation. Priority 30.04.2002. Bulletin No. 29, 2003.
 FLYING VALVE FOR A FREE PISTON. Pub. No.: WO/2008/060188 International Application No.: PCT/RU2007/000622 Publication Date: 22.05.2008 International Filing Date: 14.11.2007 

Natural gas technology